Neath is an unincorporated community in Pike Township, Bradford County, Pennsylvania, United States.

Notable people
 Sam Dodge (1889-1966), baseball player, was born in Neath.
 Alice Catherine Evans (1881-1975), microbiologist, was born in Neath.

Notes

Unincorporated communities in Bradford County, Pennsylvania
Unincorporated communities in Pennsylvania